David Grigoryevich Loriya (born 31 October 1981) is a retired Kazakhstani football goalkeeper of Georgian Jewish descent.

Career

Trials at Eredivisie clubs
On 14 July 2007 Loriya had a week's trial at PSV Eindhoven. PSV's coach Ronald Koeman was impressed by David's performance in Belgium 0-0 Kazakhstan EURO qualifier opener back in August 2006.

On 24 July 2007 he also had a trial at Sparta Rotterdam.
Neither club signed him, though David performed well during the trials

Allsvenskan and Halmstads BK

In 2007 Halmstads BK goalkeeper Magnus Bahne got injured and missed the rest of the season, Halmstad then only had one fit goalkeeper, making the club looking for a new goalkeeper for the remainder of the season and the choice became Kazakhstan international David Loriya. However, his Scandinavian journey did not last long and returned home shortly after playing only 7 games.

Loriya's contract was terminated in June 2014 before going on to sign with Karşıyaka.

Kairat
On 24 August 2018, Loriya signed for FC Kairat as a free agent, on a short-term contract until the end of the 2018 season.

International career
Loriya represented Kazakhstan at U21 level when they qualified to U21 World Cup 1999 in Nigeria. Seventeen-year-old David was the youngest player of that team. He received his first cap for Kazakhstan senior team on 26 May 2000 in a friendly against Syria at the age of 18, putting a record as the youngest player. This record was broken by Sergei Larin after five years. Loriya represented Kazakhstan in World Cup 2002, World Cup 2006, Euro 2008 and World Cup 2010 qualifiers.

Retirement
After retiring from professional football at the end of the 2019 season, Loriya was appointed Executive Director of FC Astana on 9 October 2020.

Personal
 Likes numbers 1 and 99, since his dad and grandfather played #9, 99 is a combination of both.
 He is nicknamed "Dato" in Kazakhstan

Career statistics

Club

International

Statistics accurate as of match played 10 June 2017

Honours

Club
Zhenis Astana/Astana
 Kazakhstan Premier League: 2000, 2001, 2006
 Kazakhstan Cup: 2000, 2002

Personal
 2000 Kazakhstan FF "Best goalkeeper of the year"
 2005 Kazakhstan FF "Best goalkeeper of the year"
 2006 GOAL Journal "Best Player of the year"

References

External links

1981 births
Living people
Kazakhstani Jews
Kazakhstani footballers
Jewish footballers
Allsvenskan players
Halmstads BK players
Kazakhstan Premier League players
FC Okzhetpes players
FC Astana players
FC Shakhter Karagandy players
Kazakhstan international footballers
Kazakhstani expatriate footballers
PFC Spartak Nalchik players
Çaykur Rizespor footballers
FC Kairat players
Karşıyaka S.K. footballers
TFF First League players
FC Zhenis Astana players
FC Irtysh Pavlodar players
FC Ordabasy players
Russian Premier League players
Association football goalkeepers
Kazakhstani people of Georgian descent
Expatriate footballers in Sweden
Expatriate footballers in Turkey
Expatriate footballers in Russia
Expatriate sportspeople from Georgia (country) in Sweden
Expatriate sportspeople from Georgia (country) in Turkey
Expatriate sportspeople from Georgia (country) in Russia
Kazakhstani expatriate sportspeople in Sweden
Kazakhstani expatriate sportspeople in Turkey
Kazakhstani expatriate sportspeople in Russia